Todd Rucci (born July 14, 1970) is a former professional American football player who played guard for eight seasons in the National Football League (NFL) from 1993 to 2000. He was a starter in Super Bowl XXXI for the New England Patriots.  Rucci graduated in 1988 from Upper Darby High School where he also excelled at the shot put and discus on the track team.  Todd was in the same High School Class as Bill Jensen and Tina Fey.

Drafted in 2nd round of 1993 draft(51st), Rucci was named to the New England Patriots 1990s All-Decade Team. His son Hayden Rucci plays Tight End for the University of Wisconsin–Madison, while another son Nolan Rucci was a 5-star offensive line prospect for the 2021 class before also committing to the University of Wisconsin.

External links

 "Former New England Patriot helps on Warrior football staff", Lititz Record Express, August 23, 2007
http://lancasteronline.com/news/local/corbett-appoints-former-psu-and-nfl-player-todd-rucci-to/article_7feaebb0-9b0f-11e3-af0e-001a4bcf6878.html
 "Todd Rucci|LinkedIn", Todd Rucci|Linked in

1970 births
Living people
American football offensive guards
New England Patriots players
Penn State Nittany Lions football players
People from Upper Darby Township, Pennsylvania
Players of American football from Pennsylvania
Sportspeople from Delaware County, Pennsylvania